Aeolidiella rubra is a species of sea slug, an aeolid nudibranch in the family Aeolidiidae.

Distribution 
This marine species was described from Livorno, Italy.

References 

 Gofas, S.; Le Renard, J.; Bouchet, P. (2001). Mollusca. in: Costello, M.J. et al. (Ed.) (2001). European register of marine species: a check-list of the marine species in Europe and a bibliography of guides to their identification. Collection Patrimoines Naturels. 50: pp. 180–213.

Aeolidiidae
Gastropods described in 1835